BHHS may refer to:

Schools
Barbers Hill High School
Baulkham Hills High School
Beacon Hill High School (New South Wales)
Benton Harbor High School
Beverly Hills High School
Bishop Heber High School
Bishop Hedley High School
Bishop Hendricken High School
Bismarck Henning High School
Black Hills High School
Bloomfield Hills High School
Box Hill High School
Boyden–Hull High School
Bret Harte Union High School
Brighton and Hove High School
Brookings-Harbor High School
Byram Hills High School

Other
Berkshire Hathaway Home Services